Stenostola impustulata is a species of beetle in the family Cerambycidae. It was described by Victor Motschulsky in 1860, originally under the genus Saperda. It is known from Mongolia, Japan, North Korea, China, and Russia.

References

Saperdini
Beetles described in 1860